Pam O'Connor is the former mayor and former Acting Mayor of Santa Monica, California following the death of Ken Genser. She previously served this post from 1998 to 1999, and from 2004 to 2005.

References

Mayors of Santa Monica, California
Women mayors of places in California
Living people
Year of birth missing (living people)
21st-century American women